Rhodosalinius sediminis is a Gram-negative species of bacteria from the genus of Rhodosalinus. Rhodosalinus sediminis has been isolated from a marine saltern in Wendeng, China.

References

Rhodobacteraceae